Films produced in Norway in the 1990s:

1990s

External links
 Norwegian film at the Internet Movie Database

1990s
Norwegian
Films